James Watson Mahaffey (November 2, 1936 – March 13, 2020) was an American bridge player.

Personal life 
His father was Thomas Mahaffey Jr. and he had three siblings. He was married to Mary and together they had four children, James, William, Mary and Robert and lived in Winter Park, FL. He later remarried Terry.

Bridge accomplishments

Wins

 North American Bridge Championships (5)
 Grand National Teams (1) 2004 
 Jacoby Open Swiss Teams (1) 1989 
 Mitchell Board-a-Match Teams (1) 2013 
 Chicago Mixed Board-a-Match (1) 1987 
 Spingold (1) 1988

Runners-up

 North American Bridge Championships
 Grand National Teams (1) 2005 
 Jacoby Open Swiss Teams (1) 2013 
 Reisinger (1) 1992 
 Spingold (1) 1990

References

External links
 

1936 births
2020 deaths
Sportspeople from Winter Park, Florida
Place of birth missing
American contract bridge players